Red-cheeked squirrels are species of squirrels in the genus Dremomys in the subfamily Callosciurinae. The six species which are all found only in Asia are listed as "Least Concern" by the IUCN.

The Bornean mountain ground squirrel (Dremomys everetti), found in Indonesia and Malaysia, is named after British colonial administrator and zoological collector Alfred Hart Everett.
The red-throated squirrel (Dremomys gularis) is distributed in parts of southeastern Asia, in areas of the Red River Valley of northern Vietnam and southern central Yunnan in China. It is sympatric with another member of the same genus, D. rufigenis, but lives at higher attitudes -  in the case of the type specimen.
The orange-bellied Himalayan squirrel (Dremomys lokriah) is found in Bangladesh, China, India, Myanmar, Nepal and Bhutan.
 Perny's long-nosed squirrel (Dremomys pernyi) is found in China, India, Myanmar, Taiwan, and Vietnam.
The red-hipped squirrel (Dremomys pyrrhomerus) is found in China and Vietnam.
The Asian red-cheeked squirrel (Dremomys rufigenis) is found in Cambodia, China, India, Laos, Malaysia, Myanmar, Thailand, and Vietnam.

References

 
Taxa named by Pierre Marie Heude